The Masked Singer - Inta Min ("Who Are You?") is a Pan-Arabic television series filmed in the United Arab Emirates. The series premiered on MBC 1 on December 9, 2020; and concluded on February 11 of the following year.

Contestants

References

Masked Singer
Middle East Broadcasting Center
Non-South Korean television series based on South Korean television series